El Primer Instinto is an album recorded by Mexican rock band Jaguares. The album released on October 22, 2002 under the label Sony Music International. The album consists of rearranged songs from Caifanes and Jaguares, plus two new songs.

Jaguares are:
 Saul Hernández (lead voice and assistant guitar)
 Alfonso André (drums)
 César "El Vampiro" López García (main guitar)

Guest artists include David Hidalgo, Eduardo Hernández, José Hernández, Chucho Merchán, David Campbell, Mariachi Sol de México, and La Internacional Sonora Santanera. Jimmy Z Zavala harmonica, saxophone

Track listing

Sales and certifications

References

2002 albums
Jaguares (band) albums